The Block Island Historical Society is a historical society which runs a museum at 18 Old Town Road and Ocean Avenue on Block Island (New Shoreham) in Rhode Island.

The Block Island Historical Society Museum was founded in 1942. The museum is located within Woonsocket House, a large house built in 1871. It was purchased in 1945, and numerous artifacts related to Block Island's history from "early maritime and farming displays to colonial memorabilia and scenes from Victorian summer past times. Two floors of exhibit rooms include fine furniture, textiles, quilts, boat models, tools, fishing gear, Native American artifacts, oral history tapes and other interesting displays." The museum is open daily during the summer and by appointment during the remainder of the year.

References
https://web.archive.org/web/20150807064237/http://www.blockislandtimes.com/affiliate/block-island-historical-society/12045

External links
Block Island Times information on Historical Society

See also
List of museums in Rhode Island

1942 establishments in Rhode Island
History of Rhode Island
Historical society museums in Rhode Island
New Shoreham, Rhode Island
Museums in Washington County, Rhode Island
Education in Washington County, Rhode Island
Historical societies in Rhode Island
Organizations established in 1942